Chuanyue is a Chinese genre of speculative fiction where the protagonist travels back in time to historical periods.

The first modern work of the genre is said to be A Step into the Past by Hong Kong writer Huang Yi.  Many works that can be categorized as chuanyue are published by Qidian Chinese Network, including Illumine Lingao.

Common subgenres

Qingchuan 
A popular subgenre is Qingchuan, where the often female protagonist travels back to the Qing dynasty and engages in romance with the sons of Qing Emperors.  The three novels Bubu Jingxin, Meng Hui Da Qing, and Yao Hua are the first three Qingchuan novels. They are also called "the three hills of Qingchuan novel". Qingchuan novels are of great popularity among Chinese people, especially the young women. Some of the novels like Bu Bu Jingxin are so popular that they have already been adapted into TV series.  These TV series have won great audience ratings since broadcast.

Kuaichuan 
Another popular subgenre is Kuaichuan which literally means “speedy chuanyue”. This kind of subgenre contains several short stories of different subgenres linking together, either as a recording of competition or experiences in different worlds, with a thematic character.

Publishers 
Most of these chuanyue stories are published by several light novels websites like: Qidian Chinese Network, “Red Sleeves”, Jinjiang etc. When a novel becomes very popular, the publisher may in turn publish it as hard copy; or reproduce the work in other forms like comics or TV drama.

See also

Accidental travel

References 

Chinese novels
Literary genres
Fiction about time travel
Chinese literary genres
Chinese speculative fiction